The following is a list of episodes for the American animated fantasy television series The Owl House created by Dana Terrace that premiered on Disney Channel on January 10, 2020. The series stars the voices of Sarah-Nicole Robles, Wendie Malick, Alex Hirsch, Tati Gabrielle, Issac Ryan Brown, Mae Whitman, Cissy Jones, Matthew Rhys, and Zeno Robinson.

In November 2019, the series was renewed for a second season prior to the series premiere, which premiered on June 12, 2021. After executives decided that the series "did not fit the Disney brand", it was revealed that the promised third season would be the series's last, and consist of only three 44-minute specials, the first of which premiered on October 15, 2022.

Series overview

Episodes

Season 1 (2020)
The first letters of the episode titles for this season spell out, "A WITCH LOSES A TRUE WAY".

Season 2 (2021–22)
The first letters of the episode titles for this season spell out, "SEEK THE KEY FEAR THE LOCK".

Season 3 (2022–23)
The first word of the episode titles for this season spell out, "Thanks For Watching".

Shorts

Shorts overview

Look Hooo's Talking
A series of shorts, modelled after the aftershow format, titled Look Hooo's Talking premiered on the official Disney Channel YouTube channel. The shorts, which are usually posted a day after an episode's airing but air right after its TV premiere, depict two live-action owls named Horus Herashoo and Owlyvia Kim (voiced by Hirsch and Robles, respectively) talking about the events of the most recent episode and pick apart some of the details that potentially will make an impact later in the show. At the end of each episode, the credits quickly scroll by, but when paused reveal the name of the "crew" which consists of names of the actual crew of the show, but with re-imagined bird name puns such as the creator, Dana Terrace, being renamed Danightingale Terrace.

Starting with the episode "Sense and Insensitivity", the format was retired.

Owl Pellets (2020)
In April and May 2020, Disney Channel began releasing a series of comedic shorts called Owl Pellets involving Luz, Eda, and King's antics with magic and the exploration of the Boiling Isles.

Chibi Tiny Tales (2022–23)

Chibi Tiny Tales is a series of shorts that depict characters from various Disney Channel properties in chibi-style animation. In May 2022, the series began releasing shorts based around The Owl House.

Notes

References

The Owl House
Lists of American children's animated television series episodes
Lists of Disney Channel television series episodes